Gallienica is a genus of moths in the family Erebidae erected by Paul Griveaud in 1976. All the species are known from Madagascar.

Species

References

Griveaud, P. (1976). "Descriptions préliminaires de nouveaux genres et espèces de Lymantriidae malgaches (Lep.)". Bulletin de la Société entomologique de France. 80 (1975) (9–10): 225–232.

Lymantriinae